Quantum information science is a field that combines the principles of quantum mechanics with information science to study the processing, analysis, and transmission of information. It covers both theoretical and experimental aspects of quantum physics, including the limits of what can be achieved with quantum information. The term quantum information theory is sometimes used, but it does not include experimental research and can be confused with a subfield of quantum information science that deals with the processing of quantum information.

Scientific and engineering studies
Quantum teleportation, entanglement and the manufacturing of quantum computers depend on a comprehensive understanding of quantum physics and engineering. Google and IBM have invested significantly in quantum computer hardware research, leading to significant progress in manufacturing quantum computers since the 2010s. Currently, it is possible to create a quantum computer with over 100 qubits, but the error rate is high due to the lack of suitable materials for quantum computer manufacturing. Majorana fermions may be a crucial missing material.

Quantum cryptography devices are now available for commercial use. The one time pad, a cipher used by spies during the Cold War, uses a sequence of random keys for encryption. These keys can be securely exchanged using quantum entangled particle pairs, as the principles of the no-cloning theorem and wave function collapse ensure the secure exchange of the random keys. The development of devices that can transmit quantum entangled particles is a significant scientific and engineering goal.

Qiskit, Cirq and Q Sharp are popular quantum programming languages. Additional Programming languages for quantum computers are needed, as well as a larger community of competent quantum programmers. To this end, additional learning resources are needed, since there are many fundamental differences in quantum programming which limits the amount of skills that can be carried over from traditional programming.

Related mathematical subjects
Quantum algorithm and quantum complexity theory are two of the subjects in algorithms and computational complexity theory. In 1994, mathematician Peter Shor introduced a quantum algorithm for prime factorization that, with a quantum computer containing 4,000 logical qubits, could potentially break widely used ciphers like RSA and ECC, posing a major security threat. This led to increased investment in quantum computing research and the development of post-quantum cryptography to prepare for the quantum computing era.

See also

 Glossary of quantum computing
 Information theory
 Quantum mechanics
 Quantum computing
 Quantum error correction
 Quantum information theory
 Quantum cryptography and its generalization, quantum communication
 Quantum communication complexity
 Quantum entanglement, as seen from an information-theoretic point of view
 Quantum dense coding
 Quantum teleportation
 Entanglement-assisted classical capacity
 No-communication theorem
 Quantum capacity
 Quantum communication channel
 Quantum decision tree complexity
 Timeline of quantum computing and communication

References

External links 
 Quantiki – quantum information science portal and wiki.
 ERA-Pilot QIST WP1 European roadmap on Quantum Information Processing and Communication
 QIIC – Quantum Information, Imperial College London.
 QIP – Quantum Information Group, University of Leeds.  The quantum information group at the University of Leeds is engaged in researching a wide spectrum of aspects of quantum information.  This ranges from algorithms, quantum computation, to physical implementations of information processing and fundamental issues in quantum mechanics.  Also contains some basic tutorials for the lay audience.
 mathQI Research Group on Mathematics and Quantum Information.
 CQIST Center for Quantum Information Science & Technology at the University of Southern California
 CQuIC Center for Quantum Information and Control, including theoretical and experimental groups from University of New Mexico, University of Arizona.
 CQT Centre for Quantum Technologies at the National University of Singapore
 CQC2T Centre for Quantum Computation and Communication Technology
 QST@LSU Quantum Science and Technologies Group at Louisiana State University